Ben Bucovaz (born 2 November 1990) is a former professional Australian rules footballer who played for the Fremantle Football Club in the Australian Football League (AFL).

He was selected with the 56th selection in the 2008 AFL National Draft.  Bucovaz was a member of Victoria Country's National Under 18s Championships side and played for the Geelong Amateur Football Club in the Bellarine Football League and the Geelong Falcons in the TAC Cup.

Since moving to Western Australia he has mainly played for East Fremantle in the WAFL.  At the end of the 2010 season he was delisted, but then re-drafted by Fremantle in the 2011 Rookie Draft.  He was upgraded to the senior list when Viv Michie was placed on the long-term injury list in June 2011.  Bucovaz made his AFL debut in Fremantle's loss to Melbourne at the Melbourne Cricket Ground in Round 13 of the 2011 AFL season.

References

External links

WAFL Online statistics

1990 births
Living people
Fremantle Football Club players
East Fremantle Football Club players
Australian rules footballers from Victoria (Australia)
Geelong Falcons players